Rushing means a sudden forward motion, or a surge or onslaught.

Rushing may refer to:

Tactics
 Rush (gridiron football), advancing the ball by running on offense.  On defense, charging the quarterback or kicker is a pass rush.
 Human wave attack, an offensive infantry tactic
 Rush (video gaming), a fast attack or preemptive strike intended to overwhelm an unprepared opponent, or a mass attack hoping to win by sheer numerical superiority

Other uses
 Rushing (surname), a list of people
 Rushing, Arkansas, an unincorporated community in the United States
 Rushing, a 1999 Moby song from Play
 Rushing, a component of new member recruitment for fraternities
 Rushing (sororities), a component of new member recruitment for sororities